Lorenzo Povegliano (born 11 November 1984, in Palmanova) is an Italian hammer thrower.

Biography
On 12 May 2012, in Codroipo, Povegliano threw the hammer 79.08 meters, which, in addition to being his personal best, was also the 4th best performance in the world this year, 5th best Italian performance of all time, and the standard A for the 2012 European Athletics Championships and 2012 Summer Olympics.

Personal best
Hammer throw: 79.08 m (Codroipo, 12 May 2012)

Achievements

National titles
1 win in the hammer throw at the Italian Athletics Championships (2012)
1 win in the hammer throw at the Italian Winter Throwing Championships (2012)

See also
 Italian all-time top lists - Hammer throw

References

External links
 

1984 births
Italian male hammer throwers
Living people
Athletes (track and field) at the 2012 Summer Olympics
Olympic athletes of Italy
Universiade medalists in athletics (track and field)
Universiade bronze medalists for Italy
Athletics competitors of Centro Sportivo Carabinieri
Medalists at the 2011 Summer Universiade